Dave Douglas (born March 24, 1963) is an American jazz trumpeter, composer, and educator. His career includes more than fifty recordings as a leader and more than 500 published compositions. His ensembles include the Dave Douglas Quintet; Sound Prints, a quintet co-led with saxophonist Joe Lovano; Uplift, a sextet with bassist Bill Laswell; Present Joys with pianist Uri Caine and Andrew Cyrille; High Risk, an electronic ensemble with Shigeto, Jonathan Aaron, and Ian Chang; and Engage, a sextet with Jeff Parker, Tomeka Reid, Anna Webber, Nick Dunston, and Kate Gentile.

He has won a Doris Duke Performing Artist Award, a Guggenheim Fellowship, an Aaron Copland award, and received Grammy Award nominations.  As a composer, Douglas has received commissions from the Trisha Brown Dance Company, Birmingham Contemporary Music Group, Norddeutscher Rundfunk, Essen Philharmonie, The Library of Congress, Stanford University and Monash Art Ensemble, which premiered his chamber orchestra piece Fabliaux in March 2014.

From 2002 to 2012, he served as artistic director of the Workshop in Jazz and Creative Music at the Banff Centre in Canada. He is a co-founder of the Festival of New Trumpet Music in New York with trumpeter Roy Campbell Jr. Since 2003, Douglas has served as director of the nonprofit festival. He is on the faculty at the Mannes School of Music and is a guest coach for the Juilliard Jazz Composer's Ensemble. In 2016, he accepted a four-year appointment as the artistic director of the Bergamo Jazz Festival.

In 2005 Douglas founded Greenleaf Music, a record label for his albums, sheet music, podcasts, as well as the music of other modern jazz musicians. Greenleaf has produced over 70 albums.

Early life
Born in Montclair, New Jersey, Douglas grew up in the New York City area and attended Phillips Exeter Academy, a private high school in New Hampshire. He was introduced to jazz by his father, Damon Greenleaf Douglas Jr., and as a young teen was shown jazz theory and harmony by the pianist Tommy Gallant. Douglas began performing jazz during his junior year in high school while on an abroad program in Barcelona, Spain. After graduating from high school in 1981, he studied at the Berklee College of Music and New England Conservatory, both located in Boston, Massachusetts.

Career

1980s
In 1984, Douglas moved to New York to study at New York University, to study directly with Carmine Caruso, and he finished a degree in music. Early gigs included the experimental rock band Dr. Nerve, Jack McDuff, Vincent Herring as well as street bands around New York City. He played with a variety of ensembles and came to the attention of the jazz pianist, composer, and bandleader, Horace Silver, with whom he toured the US and Europe in 1987.

In the late 1980s, Douglas began playing with bands led by Don Byron, Tim Berne, Marty Ehrlich, Walter Thompson, and others in New York. He played in the composer collectives Mosaic Sextet and New and Used. He also toured with theater companies including the world-renowned Bread and Puppet Theater and the Swiss ensemble .

1990s
In March 1993, Douglas got the opportunity to record his first album as a leader, Parallel Worlds (Black Saint/Soul Note), which featured his String Group with Mark Feldman (violin), Erik Friedlander (cello), Mark Dresser (bass), Michael Sarin (drums). The album is a collection of original pieces, some using serial composition techniques, and arrangements of Webern, Ellington, Kurt Weill and Stravinsky.

This first recording was followed in quick succession by the debuts of two groups, the Tiny Bell Trio (Songlines) with Brad Shepik and Jim Black and The Dave Douglas Sextet, with Chris Speed, Josh Roseman, Uri Caine, James Genus and Joey Baron, which recorded an homage to Booker Little called In Our Lifetime (New World).

This began a period during which Douglas recorded widely as a side musician and as a member of many new jazz groups. Douglas also began touring extensively worldwide both as a leader and as a side musician.

In 1993, Douglas also began performing with John Zorn in his Masada quartet, with Greg Cohen and Joey Baron. The group, which still occasionally performs, deals with Jewish and diaspora culture and heritage through Zorn's original compositions. As such, it is an amalgam of jazz, new music, klezmer, and purely improvised styles. The band became one of Zorn's most long-standing and popular ensembles, and brought Douglas wider attention. 

Since the mid-1990s, Douglas has led a variety of groups simultaneously. In 1996, Douglas recorded Sanctuary with Cuong Vu, Anthony Coleman, Yuka Honda, Dougie Bowne, and other musicians of the New York downtown scene of the time. The group involved sampling and DJ improvisations in addition to jazz.

In 1997, Douglas started a quartet featuring trumpet, violin, accordion, and bass (with Guy Lucevsek, Mark Feldman, and Greg Cohen) which recorded Charms of the Night Sky, incorporating sounds of Eastern European and Argentinian folk musics as well as jazz influences on the music, which is generally mellow and relaxed. The album included a number of tracks with Douglas and accordionist Guy Klucevsek performing as a duo. A second album by the Charms of the Night Sky group, A Thousand Evenings was released in 2000.

Also in 1997, Douglas founded a jazz quartet with Chris Potter, James Genus, and Ben Perowsky. This group recorded two albums in this period, Magic Triangle and Leap of Faith. Both were originally released by Arabesque Recordings, and have subsequently been reissued on Douglas's own imprint, Greenleaf Music. Greenleaf has also released sheet music containing all of the original compositions from these albums. This group further explored Douglas's interest in writing harmony for cordless groups and lyrical, accessible new acoustic jazz sounds.

Towards the end of the 1990s, Douglas formed a Quintet with Uri Caine on fender rhodes, Chris Potter, James Genus and drummer Clarence Penn. The formation of this group coincided with Douglas signing a seven-record deal with major label RCA Victor.

Douglas also began to appear at the mainstream jazz clubs around New York such as Iridium, Village Vanguard and Jazz Standard. His international touring continued with multiway residencies of his original works at festivals in Belgium, Italy, Poland, Germany, France and Spain.

It was at the end of the 1990s that Douglas first visited the Banff Centre for the Arts as a visiting artist, at the invitation of pianist Kenny Werner. A few year later he would begin a ten-year stint as the Director of the Banff International Workshop in Jazz and Creative Music.

2000s
In 2000, Douglas released Soul on Soul, a tribute to composer and pianist Mary Lou Williams, featuring original arrangements of her music for the sextet and new pieces inspired by her work. Douglas also released albums featuring Charms of the Night Sky and the Dave Douglas Quartet in the same year.

In the early years of the decade, Douglas worked often with the Trisha Brown Dance Company. El Trilogy, an extended musical work accompanying modern dance, was performed during 2000–2001.

Witness, a nine-part suite, was released in 2001. It features a band made up of trumpet, sax, two electric pianos, electronic percussion, bass, and drums. Douglas' music had always been informed by his political concerns, but this album was his most ambitious attempt to give them musical form, often by celebrating his political and cultural heroes through dedications and track titles. The album includes a 20-minute track entitled "Mahfouz", in which gravel-voiced singer Tom Waits reads an excerpt from the works of Egyptian writer Naguib Mahfouz, as well as pieces dedicated to Edward Said and Taslima Nasrin.

More recently, Douglas founded the Dave Douglas New Quintet and Nomad. The Quintet is a trumpet and tenor sax-led group but with Fender Rhodes electric piano. Their first album, The Infinite (2001), featured Douglas originals and pieces by or inspired by musicians Rufus Wainwright, Björk and Thom Yorke. This was followed up by 2004's Strange Liberation by the same group with guest Bill Frisell on guitar. Formed in 2003, Nomad is made up of trumpet, clarinet, cello, tuba, and drums. With this band, Douglas performed his suite Mountain Passages, commissioned for the Italian Sound of the Dolomites Festival, and released as the first album on Douglas' record label Greenleaf Music in 2005. The suite features a variety of different influences including Italian Ladino music, New Orleans jazz, and other musics, and is to be played from 9 to 12,000 feet above sea level.

Douglas also started a new band called Keystone, which performs works influenced by the silent film actor and director Roscoe 'Fatty' Arbuckle. The project includes pieces to be performed with Arbuckle's films. This ensemble is made up of trumpet, tenor sax, Wurlitzer (electric piano), turntables, electric bass, and drums. A CD of this music – accompanied by a DVD with two Arbuckle shorts – was released in 2005.

2006 saw Douglas release Meaning and Mystery, where he plays again with his quintet, now with Donny McCaslin in place of Chris Potter on saxophones. In December 2006, Greenleaf Music recorded all the quintet's performances over a six-night engagement at New York's Jazz Standard jazz club, called them Live at the Jazz Standard, and made the two-hour sets the band played each night available for download from the company's website within 24 hours. The 44 compositions, almost all of them by Douglas alongside covers of Wainwright, Mary J. Blige and Björk, featured 14 tunes not previously recorded by the band. Those 14 new compositions were released on a 2-CD set, Live at the Jazz Standard, in 2007.

In late 2007, Moonshine, a further recording by Keystone, was released. This was based upon recordings made of a concert performance by the band at that year's Bray Jazz Festival in Ireland. The Keystone band then led a 5-night run at Jazz Standard in April 2008. Greenleaf Music recorded and released all ten sets through their website as a download-only series, Keystone: Live at Jazz Standard (Complete Book).

In 2009, Douglas released two albums: Spirit Moves by his Brass Ecstasy band which featured Vincent Chancey, Luis Bonilla, Marcus Rojas and Nasheet Waits; and his first album of big band compositions, A Single Sky, a collaboration with Jim McNeely and the Frankfurt Radio Bigband.

2010's
In tandem with the 100th anniversary of the first Frankenstein film, Douglas collaborated with experimental film-maker Bill Morrison and released the 3-CD set Spark of Being. Written for his Keystone ensemble, the set includes three related, yet subtly different, albums to accompany the Morrison film. The first edition, entitled Soundtrack, comprises long-form pieces edited to accompany the film in real time. The second edition, Expand, contains extended performances of the original themes from the soundtrack, arranged in a traditional jazz album format. Burst, the third edition, consists of additional variations and unused outtakes recorded at the initial session.

In 2011, Douglas released three albums within the span of five months through Greenleaf Music. The albums were released only in digital format and contained approximately 30 to 50 minutes of music per album, referencing album lengths of the LP era. Released under the unifying label of the Greenleaf Portable Series, or GPS, the albums showcased ensembles that Douglas may only "rarely get to play with" in some cases.  The first album, Rare Metals featured Douglas' Brass Ecstasy ensemble. The second album, Orange Afternoons included Ravi Coltrane on tenor sax, Vijay Iyer on piano, Linda Oh on bass, Marcus Gilmore on drums. The third, Bad Mango, paired Douglas with the innovative quartet So Percussion.

After the bandleaders' intersecting tenures in the SFJAZZ Collective in 2008, Douglas joined with tenor saxophonist Joe Lovano to form the co-led quintet Sound Prints with drummer Joey Baron, bassist Linda Oh and pianist Lawrence Fields. Inspired by the music of tenor saxophonist Wayne Shorter the group debuted at New York's Village Vanguard in November 2012. In 2013 the Monterey Jazz Festival commissioned Wayne Shorter to write two pieces for the group. Sound Prints premiered "Unknown” and “To Sail Beyond The Sunset” at the festival that year. The concert resulted in Live at Monterey Jazz Festival on Blue Note Records in 2015. The group's second album Scandal, was released in 2018 on Greenleaf Music and it marked the first time the pair has recorded a full studio album of material together. The album boasts ten originals by Lovano and Douglas as well as treatments of two Shorter classics. Two tracks from the same recording session were released on a 7” 45 on green vinyl: On Pebble Street was a special release for Record Store Day in April 2018. The quintet released their third album of original compositions, Other Worlds, in May 2021. The CD artwork features space-inspired artwork by celebrated visual artist Dave Chisholm.

Douglas released Be Still in 2012. The album featured Douglas' newly formed quintet of Jon Irabagon on saxophone, Matt Mitchell on piano, Linda Oh on bass, and Rudy Royston on drums with the addition of vocalist Aoife O'Donovan. Dedicated to the memory of Douglas' mother, Emily, who died in 2011, Be Still features nine tracks, of which six are hymns and folks songs that she requested Douglas perform at her funeral. The same ensemble, minus O'Donovan, recorded and released Time Travel the following year.

Inspired by 2005's Mountain Passages, which the I Suoni delle Dolomiti festival in Northern Italy commissioned to be performed at a high altitude, Douglas initiated his 2013 tenure as the Monterey Jazz Festival's "Showcase Artist" with a benefit concert and hike at Glen Deven Ranch in Big Sur, California. The audience and performers alike hiked to a promontory overlooking the Pacific Ocean and then listened to a concert of Douglas' music.

In celebration of his 50th birthday, Douglas launched his "50 States Project" and set out to perform in each of the 50 U.S. states throughout the course of 2013. The tour aimed to include performances in "unlikely and outdoors locations for people who might not otherwise have the same kind of access to live, improvised music as those in larger cities." The tour also coincided with the release of ‘DD|50: Special Edition 50th Birthday Recordings’ a special box set that included three CDs (Pathways, Time Travel, and Be Still) and a DVD containing previously unreleased in-studio performances and art videos shot by Christoph Green.

Douglas formed the collective ensemble Riverside in collaboration with tenor saxophonist Chet Doxas, electric bassist Steve Swallow and drummer Jim Doxas out of a shared respect for Texas-born multireedist Jimmy Giuffre. The group's eponymously titled recording features originals by Douglas and Doxas, as well as Giuffre's "The Train and the River". The group's sophomore album The New National Anthem was released in May 2017 featuring the pianist and composer Carla Bley. The album features three compositions by Bley, as well as songs by Douglas, Swallow and Doxas. The group played a number of concerts and festivals in the summer and fall of 2017 with Bley as a special guest, including two concerts in Quebec and a ten-date tour of Europe

In July 2014, Douglas released a duo project Present Joys with his long-time collaborator, pianist Uri Caine. The two explore the music of the Sacred Harp tradition, taking on four pieces from the shape-note tune books as well as several new Douglas compositions undertaken in the same vein. The duo expanded with the addition of drummer Andrew Cyrille. The trio released Devotion in 2019, performing Douglas compositions inspired by Franco D’Andrea, Carla Bley, Mary Lou Williams, and Dizzy Gillespie.

The Monash Art Ensemble (MAE) is a collaboration between the Sir Zelman Cowen School of Music at Monash University in Melbourne, Australia, and the Australian Art Orchestra (AAO), an improvising chamber orchestra including some of Melbourne's finest players also affiliated with Monash University. In 2014, Dave composed a set of music drawing inspiration from composers of the early 14th century French Ars Nova, most notably Guillaume De Machaut. Scored for four winds, four brass, four strings, and four percussion, including electronics, the music explores ideas of hocket, isorhythm, and modal counterpoint as points of departure, mixing improvisation with timbre and structure in unexpected ways. The resulting album, Fabliaux, was released in 2015 on Greenleaf Music in collaboration with Australian label JazzHead.

Dave first met DJ, producer and beatmaker Shigeto (Ghostly International) at a Red Bull Music Academy event that paired musicians in a series of solo and duet improvisations, and the two found some common creative ground. Following that collaboration, Douglas formed an electronic ensemble to probe the possibilities of improvised jazz and electronic music. Adding Jonathan Maron on electric and acoustic bass and Mark Guiliana on electric and acoustic drums, as well as engineer Geoff Countryman - whose knowledge and skills as a musician and technician helped piece everything together – the group released High Risk in 2015. The group's follow up album, Dark Territory, was released on LP as a Record Store Day 2016 Exclusive.

In the fall of 2015, Dave released Brazen Heart, an album featuring his longstanding quintet with Jon Irabagon, Matt Mitchell, Linda May Han Oh, and Rudy Royston. The title track was commissioned for the Ecstatic Music Festival as a piece for large brass ensemble to be performed at the World Trade Center site in lower Manhattan, reimagined for a small group. Following a North American tour, the quintet played a week of shows at the Jazz Standard in November 2015. Recorded on the fly, each night's music was released the next day for digital download on Bandcamp, allowing fans to hear the music with a remarkable turnaround. The complete set of music – four nights, eight sets, eighty-four tracks in total – was released as Brazen Heart Live, an 8-CD box set. PopMatters compared the release to Mile Davis’ ‘Plugged Nickel’ sessions.

In 2016, Douglas joined with French pianist Frank Woeste, bassist Mat Brewer and drummer Clarence Penn to produce a cooperative album with support from the French-American Jazz Exchange. Dada People was inspired by the Dada art movement and the work of Man Ray and his circle of artists.

Douglas composed a series of twelve short compositions, each named for an Italian month of the year entitled New Sanctuary. The 2016 work touches on his compositional process from 1996'sSanctuary. It challenges the performers to maximally tease out the implications of each idea, using their own personal vocabulary to develop and explore the music in fresh ways every time. Douglas recorded the music in a new trio with guitarist Marc Ribot and percussionist Susie Ibarra.

In 2017, Douglas released Little Giant Still Life, featuring the brass quartet, The Westerlies. After encountering the group at Seattle's Earshot Jazz Festival, Douglas began writing music for group of ensemble improvisors, later adding drummer Anwar Marshall. Much of the music is inspired by the American painter Stuart Davis.

Douglas’ 2018 Subscriber Series is entitled, UPLIFT. Subtitled, “Twelve Pieces For Positive Action,” the music was conceived by Douglas as a response to the tumultuous political and social climate of the United States and beyond. Featuring twelve new Douglas compositions for a new sextet, each piece highlights a specific social cause and references organizations doing important work. The ensemble, which came together to record the music in December 2017, features saxophonist Joe Lovano, guitarists Mary Halvorson and Julian Lage, bassist Bill Laswell and drummer Ian Chang. Throughout 2018, a new track was released each month exclusively for subscribers with a CD coming out in December 2018. A descendant of UPLIFT, Douglas recorded a program of brand new compositions – ENGAGE  - as reactions and ruminations on hope and positivity. Douglas sought out specific improvisers and collaborators from different generations and backgrounds to deal with music that inspires, challenges and stirs to action. The songs were specifically built for this collaborative and dynamic ensemble including woodwind player Anna Webber, cellist Tomeka Reid, guitarist Jeff Parker, bassist Nick Dunston and drummer Kate Gentile. On some of the pieces, the ensemble is joined by trumpeters Dave Adewumi and Riley Mulherkar. The twelve pieces are built using the compositional rule of major triads, with each of the twelve pieces in the “song cycle” approaching these triads in a different way. The pieces were released monthly during 2019 to Greenleaf Music subscribers, and a culminating CD was released in December 2019.

2020-present
To honor the legacy of the great trumpeter, composer and humanist Dizzy Gillespie, Douglas wanted to explore Dizzy's experimental and wide open mind as well as the influence of his music. The project started out as a concert program, assembled for a performance presented by Jazz at Lincoln Center in February, 2018. For that, Douglas assembled a sextet that included Ambrose Akinmusire on trumpet, guitarist Bill Frisell, pianist Gerald Clayton, bassist Linda May Han Oh and Joey Baron on drums. Douglas began to conceive of a recorded version of the program, although with a different set of players. In addition to Baron, Douglas brought trumpeter Dave Adewumi, guitarist Matthew Stevens, pianist Fabian Almazan, and bassist Carmen Rothwell into the studio. The resulting album Dizzy Atmosphere: Dizzy Gillespie at Zero Gravity was released in 2020.

During the global pandemic Douglas collaborated again with the Monash Art Ensemble in 2020 as a virtual Artist in Residence. Working with a 13-piece ensemble, the musicians workshopped five pieces that Dave composed with inspiration from the Australian writer and poet Kevin Gilbert, along with lyrics contributed by ensemble members. Recording online and remotely, everyone recorded their parts separately and the music was blended together after the fact. The Dream: Monash Sessions was released in digital format in March 2021.

For the 2020 Greenleaf Music Subscriber Series, Douglas recorded a suite entitled, Marching Music. Subtitled Music to March By, Douglas conceived of these pieces as music you could have in your headphones when you attend Climate Marches, Demonstrations for Equal Rights, Voting Rights Movements, and all other actions towards a just society. Featuring a special quartet with guitarist Rafiq Bhatia, bassist Melvin Gibbs and drummer Sim Cain, the ten pieces were released throughout 2020 to subscribers.

Greenleaf Music also highlighted a number of important organizations supporting climate action, equal rights and voting rights. Overcome is a Dave Douglas recording, alongside vocalist Fay Victor, vocalist and guitarist Camila Meza, bassist Jorge Roeder, and drummer Rudy Royston, who banded together over a period of months to create a new album of songs involves the six musicians in an emotional and powerful statement of human engagement towards justice in numerous areas of society. The project began with a reimagining of the Civil Rights anthem “We Shall Overcome” featuring Victor and Meza each singing a verse before joining for a rousing final verse. As Douglas began working on the originals for the album, this unique communal vocal interplay became a key element of three more additional pieces. The album was released exclusively on Bandcamp in December 2020 in digital format. Via a successful Bandcamp vinyl pledge campaign in Spring 2021, the material will be released worldwide on Limited Edition 12” black vinyl and on all streaming platforms.

In 2021, Douglas was approached by the Kerrytown Concert House in Ann Arbor to  produce an online solo trumpet concert, which was live streamed in December 2021. Using some of that material, plus some additional performances online for Greenleaf subscribers, the album Hudson Solos emerged, all tied to thoughts about the Hudson River. A number of the pieces were released to Greenleaf Music subscribers in 2021 as part of the Subscribers Series and a CD was released in late 2021.

Secular Psalms is a new Dave Douglas studio album featuring a newly commissioned suite of ten pieces, inspired by and dedicated to The Adoration of the Mystic Lamb by Jan van Eyck and Hubert van Eyck – a polyptych originally painted for display in St. Bavo's Cathedral in Ghent, Belgium. Commissioned by Handelsbeurs Concert Hall in Gent, Belgium to celebrate the 600th anniversary of the Altarpiece with creation of new music. Drawing on Latin Mass, on early medieval folk songs, on composers of the period, like Guillaume DuFay, and on jazz and improvised music, Douglas and team deliver a lyrical, mystical, spiritual score full of upbeat optimism for our times. Douglas says the title refers to “songs of praise for all of us.” For this project Douglas branched out into new instruments including serpent, lute, organ and sampler, providing a painterly panorama of new sounds, and performed by group of international musicians: Tomeka Reid, Marta Warelis, Berlinde Deman, Frederick Leroux and Lander Gyselinck. The world premiere of the piece took place in Europe in November 2021 with performances in Gent and Brugge Belgium, the Netherlands and Germany. The CD was released by Greenleaf Music in April 2022.

Personal life
Douglas lives in the New York area, lectures regularly at The New School and travels frequently worldwide as a composer and performer. His daughter Mia was born in 1984.

Discography 

 Parallel Worlds (Soul Note, 1993)
 The Tiny Bell Trio (Songlines, 1994)
 In Our Lifetime (New World, 1995)
 Constellations (Hat Hut, 1995) with Tiny Bell Trio
 Five (Soul Note, 1996)
 Live in Europe (Arabesque, 1996) with Tiny Bell Trio
 Sanctuary  (Avant, 1997)
 Stargazer (Arabesque, 1997)
 Moving Portrait (DIW, 1998)
 Charms of the Night Sky (Winter & Winter, 1998)
 Magic Triangle (Arabesque, 1998)
 Convergence (Soul Note, 1998)
 Songs for Wandering Souls (Winter & Winter, 1999)
 Soul on Soul (RCA, 2000)
 Leap of Faith (Arabesque, 2000)
 A Thousand Evenings (RCA, 2000)
 El Trilogy (BMG, 2001)
 Witness (RCA, 2001)
 The Infinite (RCA, 2002)
 Freak In (Bluebird, 2003)
 Strange Liberation (Bluebird, 2004)
 Bow River Falls (Koch, 2004)
 Mountain Passages (Greenleaf, 2005)
 Keystone (Greenleaf, 2005)
 Meaning and Mystery (Greenleaf, 2006)
 Live at the Jazz Standard (Greenleaf, 2006)
 Moonshine (Greenleaf, 2007)
 Spirit Moves (Greenleaf, 2009)
 A Single Sky (Greenleaf, 2009)
 Spark of Being (Greenleaf, 2010)
 United Front: Brass Ecstasy at Newport (Greenleaf, 2010)
 Three Views (Greenleaf, 2011)
 Be Still (Greenleaf, 2012)
 Time Travel (Greenleaf, 2013)
 Present Joys with Uri Caine (Greenleaf, 2014)
 High Risk (Greenleaf, 2015)
 Brazen Heart (Greenleaf, 2015)
 Dark Territory (Greenleaf, 2016)
 Brazen Heart: Live at Jazz Standard (Greenleaf, 2018)
 Uplift - Twelve Pieces for Positive Action (Greenleaf, 2018)
 Devotion (Greenleaf, 2019)
 Engage (Greenleaf, 2019)
 Dizzy Atmosphere (Greenleaf, 2020)
 Marching Music (Greenleaf, 2020)
 Overcome (Greenleaf, 2020)
 Other Worlds (Greenleaf, 2021)
 Hudson Solos (Greenleaf, 2021)
 Secular Psalms (Greenleaf, 2022)
 Degrees - Book 1 of Songs of Ascent (Greenleaf, 2022)

References

External links
 Official site
 Discography 
 Album review at TracksMusic.com
 Biography, CD and concert review of Dave Douglas

1963 births
Living people
Place of birth missing (living people)
Klezmer musicians
Post-bop trumpeters
Experimental big band trumpeters
American jazz trumpeters
American male trumpeters
American jazz composers
American male jazz composers
Phillips Exeter Academy alumni
Arabesque Records artists
RCA Records artists
Avant-garde jazz trumpeters
Steinhardt School of Culture, Education, and Human Development alumni
21st-century trumpeters
21st-century American male musicians
Masada (band) members
Orange Then Blue members
SFJAZZ Collective members
Winter & Winter Records artists
Black Saint/Soul Note artists